Rob Summerfield is an American businessman and politician.

Born in Bloomer, Wisconsin, Summerfield helped run his family business the Two Acres Supper Club. He also co-owned the Chippewa Valley Land Title Company. Summerfield has served in the Wisconsin State Assembly as a Republican since 2017.

Notes

Living people
People from Bloomer, Wisconsin
Businesspeople from Wisconsin
Republican Party members of the Wisconsin State Assembly
1980 births
21st-century American politicians